Baghestan is a city in Tehran Province, Iran.

Baghestan may also refer to:

Fars Province
 Baghestan, Fars, a village in Sepidan County
 Baghestan-e Abu ol Hayat, a village in Kazerun County
 Baghestan-e Kandehi, a village in Kazerun County
 Baghestan Rural District (Fars Province), in Bavanat County

Hormozgan Province
 Baghestan, Bandar Abbas, a village in Bandar Abbas County
 Baghestan, Parsian, a village in Parsian County

Isfahan Province
 Baghestan-e Bala, a village in Natanz County
 Baghestan-e Pain, a village in Natanz County

Qazvin Province
 Baghestan, Qazvin, a village in Qazvin Province

Semnan Province
 Baghestan, Shahrud, a village in Shahrud County

South Khorasan Province
 Baghestan, Sarbisheh, a village in South Khorasan Province
 Baghestan, Zirkuh, a village in South Khorasan Province
 Baghestan-e Ferdows, a city in South Khorasan Province
 Baghestan (Ferdows County), a city in South Khorasan Province
 Baghestan-e Sofla, a village in South Khorasan Province
 Baghestan Rural District (South Khorasan Province), in South Khorasan Province

West Azerbaijan Province
 Baghestan, West Azerbaijan, a village in Urmia County

Yazd Province
 Baghestan, Yazd, a village in Taft County